The 2008 WGC-CA Championship was a golf tournament that was contested from March 20–23 at Doral Golf Resort & Spa in Doral, Florida. It was the ninth WGC-CA Championship tournament, and the second of three World Golf Championships events held in 2008.

Geoff Ogilvy won the tournament to capture his second World Golf Championships title.  Tiger Woods was the 3-time defending champion but finished in 5th place.

Field
1. Top 50 players from the Official World Golf Rankings two weeks prior to event
Robert Allenby (2,3), Stephen Ames (2), Stuart Appleby (2), Woody Austin (2,3), Aaron Baddeley (2,3), Ángel Cabrera (2,6), Mark Calcavecchia (2,3), Paul Casey (2,6), K. J. Choi (2,3,4,5), Stewart Cink (2,3,4,5), Tim Clark (2,3), Luke Donald (2), Ernie Els (2,3,6,7), Niclas Fasth (2,6), Jim Furyk (2,3), Sergio García (2,3,6), Retief Goosen (2,6), Richard Green, Søren Hansen (2,6), Charles Howell III (2,3), Trevor Immelman (2), Miguel Ángel Jiménez (2,7,8), Zach Johnson (2,3), Robert Karlsson (2), Martin Kaymer (2,7,8), Justin Leonard (2,4,5), Hunter Mahan (2,3), Phil Mickelson (2,3,4,5), Arron Oberholser (2), Geoff Ogilvy (2,3), Sean O'Hair (2,5), Nick O'Hern (2), Ian Poulter (2), Andrés Romero (2,6), Justin Rose (2,3,6), Rory Sabbatini (2,3), Adam Scott (2,3,7,8), Vijay Singh (2,3,5,7,8), Brandt Snedeker (2,3), Henrik Stenson (2,6,7,8), Richard Sterne (2,6), Steve Stricker (2,3,4,5), Toru Taniguchi (2,10), Scott Verplank (2,3), Boo Weekley (2,3), Mike Weir (2), Lee Westwood (2,6,7,8), Brett Wetterich (3), Tiger Woods (2,3,4,5)
Pádraig Harrington (2,3,6) did not play.

2. Top 50 players from the Official World Golf Rankings one week prior to event
Nick Dougherty (6), Shingo Katayama (10)

3. Top 30 from the final 2007 PGA Tour FedEx Cup points list
Jonathan Byrd, John Rollins, Heath Slocum, Camilo Villegas

4. Top 10 from the PGA Tour FedEx Cup points list two weeks prior to event
Daniel Chopra, J. B. Holmes (5), Ryuji Imada (5), D. J. Trahan

5. Top 10 from the PGA Tour FedEx Cup points list one week prior to event

6. Top 20 from the final 2007 European Tour Order of Merit
Anders Hansen, Peter Hanson, Grégory Havret, Søren Kjeldsen, Colin Montgomerie, Graeme Storm

7. Top 10 from the European Tour Order of Merit two weeks prior to event
Mark Brown (8), Shiv Chawrasia, Ross Fisher (8)

8. Top 10 from the European Tour Order of Merit one week prior to event
Graeme McDowell, Jeev Milkha Singh

9. Top 3 from the final 2007 Asian Tour Order of Merit
Anton Haig, Liang Wenchong, Chapchai Nirat

10. Top 3 from the final 2007 Japan Golf Tour Order of Merit
Brendan Jones

11. Top 3 from the final 2007 PGA Tour of Australasia Order of Merit
Craig Parry, Paul Sheehan
David Smail did not play.

12. Top 3 from the final 2007 Sunshine Tour Order of Merit
James Kingston, Andrew McLardy, Louis Oosthuizen

Past champions in the field

Round summaries

First round

Second round

Third round

Final round

Scorecard
Final round

Cumulative tournament scores, relative to par

Source:

References

External links
Full results

WGC Championship
Golf in Florida
WGC-CA Championship
WGC-CA Championship
WGC-CA Championship